Pacé may refer to:

 Pacé, Ille-et-Vilaine, in Brittany, France
 Pacé, Orne, in Normandy, France
 Bertrand Pacé (born 1961), French racing sailor

See also
 Pace (disambiguation)